Ny Vestergade 13 is a Neoclassical townhouse located opposite the main entrance to the National Museum in central Copenhagen, Denmark. Countess Danner used it as winter residence after Frederick VII of Denmark in 1863 while spending the summers at Skodsborg.

History

18th century

The site was originally property which comprised the entire western part of the block. This property was listed in the new [[cadastre of 1756 as No. 318 and belonged to Ulrik Frederik Edinger at that time. It was later divided into a number of smaller properties. The property was subsequently initially referred to as No. 318 E

The present building on the site was constructed as a private residence for hotel owner Christen Christensen Bording in 1792-1793. The architect is not known but was probably one of Caspar Friedrich Harsdorff's students. Professor of theology at the University of CopenhagenFriedrich Münter (1761-1830)  was a resident in the building in 1797-98.

118001860
The property was listed in the new cadastre of 1806 as No. 215 in the West Quarter. It belonged to one etatsråd Eggers at that time.

The property was later purchased by timber merchant Christian Ludvig Maag. In 1744-57, he commissioned Michael Gottlieb Bindesbøll tp refurbish the building which was also heightened with an extra floor. He also charged Georg Hilker, P. C. Skovgaard and Constantin Hansen with decorating the first floor. Hilker was a resident in the building for a couple of years after completing his work for Maag.

Dansk Arbejdsgiverforening refurbished in 1975-1978 under supervision of the architect Preben Hansen (1908-1989) and in collaboration with the National Museum. The renovation received an award from the City of Copenahgen in 1880.

Countess Danner
Countess Danner purchased the building in 1864 and used it as a summer residence until her death. The rest of the year was spent in her house in Skodsborg or at Jægerspris Castle..

Later history
The property was home to 32 residents in five households at the time of the 1880 census. Menca Koppel (1833-1904), a lawyer, resided on the first floor with his wife Fanny Rosalie Koppel, their seven children (aged three to 19), one male servant and three maids. One of the later editor-im-chief and politician Baldemar Koppel. Another son was the later bookseller Hans Koppel, father of designer Henning Koppel. Jens Frederik Nielsen, an office courier, resided on the first floor with his wife and their one-year-old sson. Christian Rostgaard von der Maase, a military officer with rank of colonel, resided on the second floor with his wife Caroline Amalie von der Maasem their four children (aged 1 to six), a nake servants, a wet nurse and three maids. Carl Christian Frederik Calundan, a man in his 50s (no profession mentioned), resided on the third floor with his nephew Harald Vilhelm Minus Calundan	and a housekeeper. Anders Jensen, a concierge, resided in the basement with his wife Johanne Jensen.

Today
The building is part of the headquarters of Dansk Arbejdsgiverforening.

Further reading
 Minderige huse – kendte mænd og kvinders boliger. Kraks Forlag. 1922.
  Raabyemagle, Hanne: ''Ny Vestergade 13, . Dansk Arbejdsgiverforening. 1993.

References

External links
 Source

Listed residential buildings in Copenhagen
Houses completed in 1683